Parella is a comune (municipality) in the Metropolitan City of Turin in the Italian region Piedmont, located about 40 km north of Turin in the Canavese.

It is home to a 13th-17th-century castle with  frescoes and paintings.

References

External links

Cities and towns in Piedmont